Christopher Furness may refer to:

Christopher Furness, 1st Baron Furness (1852–1912) was a British businessman, baron and politician
Christopher Furness (VC) (1912–1940), English recipient of the Victoria Cross
Sir Christopher Furness, 2nd Baronet (1900–1974), of the Furness baronets

See also
Furness (disambiguation)